Fred G. Meyer (February 21, 1886 – September 2, 1978) was an American businessman who founded the Oregon-based Fred Meyer store chain, which had 63 stores in 4 western states at the time of his death. He was known for successfully introducing several innovative marketing concepts.

Early life
Born Fritz Grubmeyer in Germany in 1886, Meyer came to the United States with his parents and older brother, William, in 1889. The family settled in Brooklyn, New York City, where Meyer later worked in his father's grocery store. Meyer completed his education up to fifth grade before ceasing attending school.

Career
Leaving home at the age of 19, he traveled through the American West, prospecting for gold near Nome, Alaska. Relocating to Seattle in 1906, Meyer worked for a small grocery and the Grand Union Tea Company until 1909, when he moved to Portland, Oregon.

In 1910, Meyer's brother William and his family moved to Portland. William and Fred managed the Mission Tea Company, which rented a stall at the City Public Market. Thereafter, Fred established a separate business using horse-drawn wagons to deliver coffee, tea, and spices to Portland residents and groceries to nearby logging camps and farms. By 1911, Meyer was managing Mission Tea, and after a dispute with William, he acquired a new partner and renamed the business the Java Coffee Company. Sometime after arriving in Portland, Frederick Grubmeyer shortened his name to Fred G. Meyer; a 2001 Oregonian article said the change was made "for convenience and maybe to save money on signs".

In 1922, he joined forces with his brother Henry, who had also moved to Portland. Together over the next few years they incorporated four businesses, including Mybros Meat Market, Oregon Piggly Wiggly, Pioneer Market Company (which leased space to vendors), and Mybros Inc., all in downtown Portland. Differences of opinion between the brothers led to Henry's departure from the partnership, and over time, Meyer expanded Mybros into the Fred Meyer chain of supermarkets and department stores.  A "self-service drugstore" that Meyer opened in 1928 in downtown Portland was considered the first of its kind in the nation.

Meyer introduced innovative marketing concepts; he is often credited as one of the originators of the "one-stop shopping" concept, when in 1931, he built the Hollywood Fred Meyer, his first full-block megastore on Northeast Sandy Boulevard at 42nd Avenue in Portland (now a Rite Aid since the store's relocation to Hollywood West in 1988).

Meyer's wife, Eva Mayer, died in 1960. Their marriage had lasted 40 years.  Eva Meyer was also secretary-treasurer of Fred Meyer Inc. until her death.  The couple had no children together, but Eva had one son from a previous marriage, Earle A. Chiles (namesake of the Chiles Center), who also worked as an officer of the company.

Meyer was opposed to zoning, specifically naming the model of Houston, Texas, as a successful example.  He continued to work regularly until his death, even after suffering a major stroke in 1972.  In 1974, his company expanded into the savings and loan business with the establishment of Fred Meyer Savings & Loan, which had 29 locations (in Fred Meyer stores) by 1978.  He was named Portland's "First Citizen" in 1976.

Death
Meyer died on September 2, 1978, at the age of 92, at his Portland home. He died in his sleep, but had been dealing with chronic heart disease and breathing difficulties in his last few years.  In its obituary, Portland's The Oregonian described Meyer as "the venerable merchant whose name and shopping-center empire have been linked for almost 70 years with the city's growth".  Oregon Governor Bob Straub was quoted as saying, "Oregon has lost one of its great citizens."

Philanthropy
Although known for living frugally, Meyer gave to many charities, in particular the Salvation Army, and became known for his philanthropy. Upon his death, his stock in Fred Meyer established the Meyer Memorial Trust, leaving behind $60 million to be used for "religious, charitable, scientific, literary or educational purposes." He was cremated, and his remains were scattered in the Salmon River near Wemme on Mount Hood.

The Meyer Memorial Trust is distinct from the Fred Meyer Fund, controlled by Kroger, which now owns Fred Meyer Stores.

Notes

References

Works cited

External links
 Fred Meyer Company Website
 
 
 Fred Meyer Story - Oregon History Museum

1886 births
1978 deaths
American businesspeople in retailing
American grocers
Businesspeople from New York City
Businesspeople from Oregon
American people of German descent
Kroger
20th-century American businesspeople